This is a list of organizations involved in nanotechnology.

Government

Brazil 
 Brazilian Nanotechnology National Laboratory

China 
 National Center for Nanoscience and Technology

Canada 
 National Institute for Nanotechnology
 Waterloo Institute for Nanotechnology

Europe 
 EU Seventh Framework Programme
 Action Plan for Nanosciences and Nanotechnologies 2005-2009

India 

Institute of Nano Science and Technology, DST- GOI
Indian Nano-Biologist Association (https://www.inba.org.in/)
Centre for Nano and Soft Matter Sciences
Indian Association for the Cultivation of Science
S.N. Bose National Centre for Basic Sciences
National Chemical Laboratory
Jawaharlal Nehru Centre for Advanced Scientific Research
Saha Institute of Nuclear Physics
 Institute of Nano Science and Technology
 Center For Converging Technologies, University of Rajasthan, Jaipur
 Center For Nano Science and Engineering, IISc http://www.cense.iisc.ac.in
 Special Centre for Nano Sciences, JNU, New Delhi
 Centre for Nanoscience and Nanotechnology, JMI, New Delhi
 Department of Nano Science and Technology (TNAU), Coimbatore (https://www.tnaunanoagri.in/)
Department of Nanotechnology (University of Kashmir)

Iran 
 Iranian Nanotechnology Laboratory Network
 Iran Nanotechnology Initiative Council (INIC)

Ireland 
 Collaborative Centre for Applied Nanotechnology

Russia 
 Russian Nanotechnology Corporation

Sri Lanka 
 Sri Lanka Institute of Nanotechnology

Thailand 
 National Nanotechnology Center (NanoTec)

United States 
 National Cancer Institute
 Alliance for Nanotechnology in Cancer
 National Institutes of Health
 Nanomedicine Roadmap Initiative
 American National Standards Institute Nanotechnology Panel (ANSI-NSP)
 NanoNed
 National Nanotechnology Initiative

Venezuela 
 Instituto Zuliano de Investigaciones Tecnológicas (INZIT)

Advocacy and information groups
 Indian Nano-Biologist Association (https://www.inba.org.in/)
Nanotechnology Industries Association (NIA)
 International Institute for Nanotechnology
 American Nano Society
 International Association of Nanotechnology
 Center for Biological and Environmental Nanotechnology, Rice University
 CMC Microsystems, Canada
 Foresight Institute (FI)
 Nano Science and Technology Institute (NSTI)
 Center for Responsible Nanotechnology
 Nanotechnology Industries
 Project On Emerging Nanotechnologies
 The Nanoethics Group
 American Chemistry Council Nanotechnology Panel
 Materials Research Society
 International Council on Nanotechnology (ICON) at Rice University
 Schau-Platz NANO, Munich, Germany
 National Nanomanufacturing Network (NNN)
 National Nanotechnology Manufacturing Center (NNMC)
 Institute of Occupational Medicine, Scotland, UK
 Safenano, Europe's Centre of Excellence on Nanotechnology Hazard and Risk
 Institute of Nanotechnology, Stirling, Scotland, UK
 Nanoworld, Russian Society of Scanning Probe Microscopy and Nanotechnology
 Nano Science and Technology Consortium (NSTC)
 Biological Applications of Nanotechnology (BANTech), University of Idaho
 Institute of Environmental Sciences and Technology (IEST)
 Intelligent Testing Strategies for Engineered Nanomaterials (ITS-NANO)
 Bangladesh Nano Society (BNS)

Publishers
 American Chemical Society - Nano Letters
 Institute of Physics - Nanotechnology
 Encyclopedia of Nanoscience and Nanotechnology
 NanoTrends - A Journal of Nanotechnology and its Applications
 SPIE—International Society for Optics and Photonics - Journal of Nanophotonics

Higher education and Research Institutes

See also Nanotechnology education for a listing of universities with nanotechnology degree programs.

United States
 Biological Applications of Nanotechnology at University of Idaho
 Birck Nanotechnology Center at Purdue University
 California Institute of Nanotechnology
 California Nanosystems Institute at University of California, Los Angeles and University of California, Santa Barbara
 Center for Biological and Environmental Nanotechnology at Rice University
 Center for Hierarchical Manufacturing at University of Massachusetts Amherst
 Center for Integrative Nanotechnology Sciences at University of Arkansas at Little Rock
 Center for Nanostructure Characterization and Fabrication at the Georgia Institute of Technology
 Center for Nanotechnology in Society at Arizona State University
 Center for Nanotechnology in Society at University of California, Santa Barbara
 Center of Integrated Nanomechanical Systems and Berkeley Nanosciences and Nanoengineering Institute at University of California, Berkeley
 College of Nanoscale Science and Engineering at SUNY Albany
 Cornell NanoScale Science & Technology Facility (CNF) at Cornell University
 Institute for Micromanufacturing at Louisiana Tech University
 Institute for NanoBioTechnology at Johns Hopkins University
 Institute for Nanoscale and Quantum Scientific and Technological Advanced Research (nanoSTAR) at University of Virginia
 Institute for Soldier Nanotechnologies at MIT
 Kavli Institute at Cornell for Nanoscale Science
 Kavli Institute for Bionano Science and Technology at Harvard University
 Kavli Nanoscience Institute at Caltech
 Nanofabrication Facility at Carnegie Mellon University
 Nanofabrication Facility at University of Delaware
 Nanoscale Science and Engineering Center at Columbia University
 NanoScience Technology Center at University of Central Florida
 Nanostructured Fluids and Particles at MIT
 Nano/Bio Interface Center at University of Pennsylvania
 Nebraska Center for Materials and Nanoscience University of Nebraska–Lincoln
 Network for Computational Nanotechnology at Purdue University hosting
 Petersen Institute of Nanoscience and Engineering (PINSE) at University of Pittsburgh Swanson School of Engineering
 Pittsburgh Quantum Institute
 Richard E Smalley Institute for Nanoscale Science and Technology at Rice University
 Textiles Nanotechnology Laboratory at Cornell University
 Davis Nano Group at Brigham Young University
 Vanderbilt Institute of Nanoscale Science and Engineering at Vanderbilt University
 Nano Institute of Utah at University of Utah
 Singh Center for Nanotechnology at University of Pennsylvania

Europe

Denmark 
 DTU Nanotech Department of Micro and Nanotechnology at Technical University of Denmark

European Union 
 ePIXnet Nanostructuring Platform for Photonic Integration EU funded Framework 6 ePIXnet project

France 
 Minatec
 CEA Léti
 Institut Néel
 Institut des nanotechnologies de Lyon
 Institut des Nanosciences de Paris

Germany 
 Center for Applied Nanotechnology (CAN)
 Center for Nanotechnology at University of Münster
 Institute of Nanotechnology at Karlsruhe Institute of Technology
 Karlsruhe Nano Micro Facility at Karlsruhe Institute of Technology

Hungary 
 Research Institute for Technical Physics and Materials Science at Hungarian Academy of Sciences

Ireland 
 Collaborative Centre for Applied Nanotechnology

Netherlands 
 Kavli Institute of Nanoscience at Delft University of Technology
 MESA+ Institute for Nanotechnology at University of Twente

Portugal 
 International Iberian Nanotechnology Laboratory

Poland 
 Center for Nanotechnology at Gdańsk University of Technology

Spain 
 Catalan Institute of Nanoscience and Nanotechnology (ICN2)
 Molecular Nanotechnology Lab, University of Alicante

Switzerland 
 Swiss Nanoscience Institute (SNI)

United Kingdom 
 Bristol Centre for Functional Nanomaterials at University of Bristol
 London Centre for Nanotechnology
 James Watt Nanofabrication Centre at University of Glasgow
 Manufacturing Engineering Centre at Cardiff University
 Nanoscale Science & Nanotechnology Group at Newcastle University
 Southampton Nanofabrication Centre at University of Southampton

International

Australia 
 Flinders Institute for Nanoscale Science & Technology at Flinders University in South Australia
 The University of Sydney Nano Institute (Sydney Nano), at The University of Sydney in Sydney, NSW
 Australian Institute for Bioengineering and Nanotechnology at University of Queensland in Queensland
 Nanotechnology in Victoria Consortium joint investment with Monash University and Swinburne University of Technology

Canada 
 4D LABS at Simon Fraser University
 Microsystems and Nanotechnology Research Group at The University of British Columbia
 Waterloo Institute for Nanotechnology at University of Waterloo
 BioNano Laboratory at University of Guelph
 Canadian Nano Society at nanosociety.ca

Egypt 
 Naqaa Nanotechnology Network NNN, an affiliate of Naqaa foundation for Scientific Research, Technology and Development
 NanoTech Egypt
 Egypt Nanotechnology Center
 Center for Nanotechnology (CNT) at Nile University
 NBE Institute for Nanoscience and Informatics (INI) at Zewail City of Science and Technology
 Yousef Jameel Science and Technology Research Center at American University in Cairo

India 
Institute of Nano Science and Technology
Deenbandhu Chhotu Ram University of Science and Technology
 Srinivas Institute of Technology
 Centre for Nano and Soft Matter Sciences
 Centre for Nano Science and Engineering, Indian Institute of Science
 Nano-Materials Research Lab, Tata Institute of Fundamental Research
 Center for Excellence in Nano-Electronics, Department of Electrical Engineering, IIT Bombay
 Nanoscale Research Facility, IIT Delhi
 Sophisticated Analytical Instrumentation Facility, DST Unit of Nanoscience, IIT Madras
 Thematic Unit of Excellence, IIT Kanpur
 K.B Chandrashekar Centre for Nanoscience and Technology, Anna University
 Department of Physics, Banaras Hindu University
 Department of Technology, Savitribai Phule Pune University
 Centre for Research in Nanoscience and Nanotechnology, University of Calcutta
 National Centre for Nanoscience and Nanotechnology, University of Madras
 School Of Material Science and Nanotechnology, Jadavpur University
 Nanotechnology Research Center, SRM University
 Centre for Nanotechnology Research, VIT University
 Amrita Centre for Nanoscience and Molecular Medicine, Cochin
 Centre for Nanoscience and Technology, Hyderabad
 Centre for Converging Technologies, University of Rajasthan
 National Institute of Pharmaceutical Education and Research
 Centre for Nanoscience and Nanotechnology, Panjab University, Chandigarh
 University Centre of Instrumentation and Microelectronics, Punjab University
 Nano Cellulose Research Lab, Central Institute for Research on Cotton Technology
 Centre for Nanoscience and Nanotechnology, Sathyabama University
 
 Post Graduate Department of Nanoscience and Technology, Mount Carmel College, Bengaluru.
 School of Nanoscience and Technology, Shivaji University, Kolhapur, 416004 Maharashtra
Centre for nanoscience and technology, pondicherry university

Centre for Research of Nanotechnology, University of Kashmir

Israel 
 Tel Aviv University Center for Nanoscience and Nanotechnology

Japan 
 Frontier Research Center, Tokyo Institute of Technology, Yokohama
 National Institute for Materials Science
 International Center for Materials Nanoarchitectonics

Jordan 
 Center for Nanotechnology Research and Development at Jordan University of Science and Technology

Mexico 
 Nanoscience and Nanotechnology Center at National Autonomous University of Mexico
 Nanotechnology Cluster of Nuevo Leon, AC

Pakistan 
Preston Institute of Nanoscience and Technology

Saudi Arabia 
 Nanofabrication Core Lab at King Abdullah University of Science and Technology (KAUST)

South Korea 
 Nano-Biomedicine & Imaging Laboratory at Chungju National University

Turkey 
 Materials Science and Nanotechnology Program at Bilkent University
 National Nanotechnology Research Center
 Nanotechnology and Nanomedicine Program at Hacettepe University
 SUNUM Nanotechnology Research and Application Center at Sabanci University

Manufacturers
 Cerion Advanced Materials, United States
 Genisphere, United States
 nanoComposix, United States
 Nanos scientificae, Slovenia
nanoCLO (SMC-Pvt) Ltd. Pakistan. Manufacturers of Nanofibers Membranes.

See also

 List of nanotechnology topics

References

Nanotechnology companies
Nanotechnology institutions